Sir Geoffrey Winston Russell Palmer  (born 21 April 1942) is a New Zealand lawyer, legal academic, and former politician, who was a member of Parliament from 1979 to 1990. He served as the 33rd prime minister of New Zealand for a little over a year, from August 1989 until September 1990, leading the Fourth Labour Government. As minister of justice from 1984 to 1989, Palmer was responsible for considerable reforms of the country's legal and constitutional framework, such as the creation of the Constitution Act 1986, New Zealand Bill of Rights, Imperial Laws Application Act, and the State Sector Act. He served as president of the New Zealand Law Commission, from 2005 to 2010.

Early life and education
Palmer was born in Nelson and attended Nelson Central School, Nelson Intermediate School and Nelson College. At Victoria University of Wellington, he studied both political science and law. He graduated with a Bachelor of Arts degree in 1964 and a Bachelor of Laws in 1965. After working for a time in Wellington, he attended the University of Chicago Law School, gaining a Juris Doctor in 1967. He moved from New Zealand to Iowa in August 1969 to become a professor at the University of Iowa College of Law. In his first year, he taught the newly adapted small-section courses of American Property law, Conflict Resolution, and International law. He also developed the curriculum for a Torts course to be taught during the second year of law school. This was the first course of its kind in the United States and he was granted tenure in his second year of teaching at the college. In 1972, he left to be a visiting professor at the University of Virginia College of Law. Eventually, in 1974, he was appointed to a professorship of law at Victoria University of Wellington, bringing him back to New Zealand. At the 1975 general election, Palmer took part in the "Citizens for Rowling" campaign.

Political career

Member of Parliament

In a 1979 by-election, Palmer was elected to Parliament as the member for Christchurch Central, having stood as the Labour Party candidate. In March 1981 he was elevated to the shadow cabinet as spokesperson for constitutional affairs and associate spokesperson for justice. Following Labour's unexpected loss at the 1981 general election Palmer gained the social welfare and accident compensation portfolios.

In 1983 Palmer stood for the deputy leadership of the party. In a three-way contest, in which all candidates were from Christchurch to reflect geographical proportionality, Palmer trailed on the first ballot to Papanui MP Mike Moore. Lyttelton MP Ann Hercus was eliminated and on the second ballot almost all of her supporters voted for Palmer, who beat Moore by one vote. He became deputy Leader of the Opposition.

When, in 1984, the Labour Party won the general elections, Palmer became Deputy Prime Minister of the Fourth Labour Government. He also became Attorney-General and Minister of Justice. The new justice minister, who had promoted proportional representation as a law professor in his book Unbridled Power?, also published in 1984, set up a Royal Commission to investigate the electoral system and propose modifications or alternatives. His Royal Commission reported in December 1986, recommending the mixed-member proportional representation system. After the 1987 elections, when Labour was re-elected, he also became Minister of the Environment, an area in which he took personal interest.

Leadership
The most notable feature of New Zealand politics at the time was the economic change promoted by the Finance Minister, Roger Douglas. Douglas was advancing monetarist policies involving extensive privatisation of state assets and the removal of tariffs and subsidies—these reforms were dubbed "Rogernomics". These policies, which contravened Labour's basic policy platform and campaign promises, were deeply unpopular with Labour's traditional support base, and resulted in a confrontation between Prime Minister David Lange and Roger Douglas. Lange also reneged from his promise to hold a binding referendum on the MMP system. Palmer conceded defeat on MMP at an April 1989 Labour regional conference, saying that the issue was "effectively dead for the immediate future." Eventually, Douglas was removed from Cabinet, but the dispute had weakened Lange enough that he resigned a month later. Palmer, being deputy leader, took over as Prime Minister. Electoral reformers in the Labour Party kept up the pressure, and in September 1989, after Palmer had become prime minister, the full annual conference of the Labour Party passed a remit endorsing a referendum on the principle of proportional representation.

Palmer, however, was perceived by the public as being too closely involved with Douglas's reforms. Of particular concern to many people was his work on the legal aspects of state sector rearrangement, such as his preparation of the State Owned Enterprises Act. The presence of David Caygill (a Douglas ally) as Minister of Finance further compounded perception that Palmer was doing nothing to address public concerns. The only area in which Palmer won praise from traditional left-wing supporters was in his handling of the Environment portfolio, which he kept when he became Prime Minister – it was his work here in initiating the resource management law reform process that eventually led to the creation of the Resource Management Act 1991.

Palmer later reflected on his brief premiership:

Two months before the 1990 elections, it was clear that Labour would not win. The perceived damage done by Roger Douglas's reforms, as well as Palmer's lack of general charisma, caused too many Labour supporters to abandon the party. In addition, Palmer was perceived as being too academic and aloof, reminding people of the paternalistic attitude that Douglas was accused of. Palmer was replaced by Mike Moore, who Labour believed would give it a better chance of winning. Palmer stated he had been prepared to lead the party to a likely defeat but was just as happy to step aside: "I was actually pretty pleased to get out at the end of 1990. I was quite happy to run through as PM and take the defeat, but if other people wanted to do it — be my guest"!

Palmer also chose to retire from parliament at the election, and was replaced as the Labour candidate in his seat by Lianne Dalziel. The leadership change failed, however, and the opposition National Party under Jim Bolger won a landslide victory.

Palmer became the second Labour leader to leave the party leadership without ever leading the party into an election after Alfred Hindmarsh. Of the Labour Prime Ministers and notwithstanding Hugh Watt's tenure as interim prime minister following the death of Norman Kirk, Palmer is the only one who had not also served as Leader of the Opposition before and/or after his tenure as Prime Minister.

After Parliament
Palmer later went on to serve as Professor of Law at Victoria University again. He also held a position as Professor of Law at the University of Iowa, and worked for a time as a law consultant. While at the University of Iowa he taught courses on International law and global environment issues as well as a two-week mini course about the International Court of Justice. The MMP system which he had helped promote was adopted in a 1993 referendum. In 1994, he established Chen Palmer & Partners, a specialist public law firm he began with Wellington lawyer Mai Chen. In September 2001 Palmer became a founding trustee of Motu Economic and Public Policy Research and in December 2002 was appointed to be New Zealand's representative to the International Whaling Commission (IWC). Palmer continued his involvement with, and teaching at Victoria University of Wellington and was regularly engaged as an expert consultant on public and constitutional law issues. , Palmer is an honorary fellow in the Faculty of Law at Victoria University of Wellington, and coordinates and lectures a course on public law and constitutional values in relation to public inquiries. His son Matthew Palmer was also a prominent legal academic and public servant, and was appointed a High Court judge in 2015.

Law Commissioner

On 1 December 2005 Palmer was appointed to the presidency of the New Zealand Law Commission (the government agency that reviews, reforms and seeks to improve the country's laws) by the Governor-General for a term of five years. During his tenure, he persuaded the Government to engage in a programme of reviewing the old Law Commission reports with a view to actioning them. This resulted in a number of existing reports being actioned. Palmer stepped down from the Law Commission at the end of his tenure on 1 December 2010.

UN Inquiry
In August 2010 Palmer was chosen to chair a UN Inquiry panel  into the fatal Israeli raid on the Mavi Marmara, a Turkish ship participating in a Gaza-bound protest flotilla in May of that year. The panel included the outgoing Colombian President Álvaro Uribe as the Vice-chair, and representatives from Turkey and Israel. The report, released on 2 September 2011, found that Israel's "naval blockade was imposed as a legitimate security measure in order to prevent weapons from entering Gaza by sea and its implementation complied with the requirements of international law," and that Israeli soldiers enforcing the blockade faced "organized and violent resistance from a group of passengers" when they boarded the ship. However, the report also found that the Israeli soldiers responded with "excessive and unreasonable" force and recommended that Israel make "an appropriate statement of regret" and pay compensation.

Constitutional reform campaign 

In September 2016, Palmer and legal academic Andrew Butler published A Constitution for Aotearoa New Zealand. In this book the pair outlined their arguments for New Zealand to adopt a written Constitution, and also drafted out what this would look like. They then invited public submissions on the subject online and spent a year promoting the book and their campaign. The pair released a second book in 2018, Towards Democratic Renewal, that amends some of their proposal in the previous text and further argues their cause for a written Constitution, taking on board the response of the public. This campaign is ongoing.

Honours and awards
Palmer was appointed a member of Her Majesty's Privy Council in 1985. He was appointed a Knight Commander of the Order of St Michael and St George in the 1991 New Year Honours, and made an Honorary Companion of the Order of Australia in the same year. In 1991 he was listed on the United Nations Global 500 Roll of Honour for his work on environmental issues.  These included reforming resource management law. Palmer also sat as a Judge ad hoc on the International Court of Justice in 1995. He holds honorary doctorates from three universities. In 2008 Palmer was one of the first people appointed as Senior Counsel during the temporary change from Queen's Counsel in the Helen Clark Government.

Lectures
 Lecture entitled Perspectives on International Dispute Settlement from a Participant in the Lecture Series of the United Nations Audiovisual Library of International Law
 Constitutional change and democratic renewal on 9 October 2017 at TEDxVUW conference, Victoria University of Wellington.

Notes

References

External links

Profile, NZ History
Prime Minister's Office biography (archived)
Law Commission biography

|-

|-

|-

|-

|-

|-

|-

|-

|-

1942 births
Living people
Attorneys-General of New Zealand
Deputy Prime Ministers of New Zealand
New Zealand members of the Privy Council of the United Kingdom
New Zealand education ministers
New Zealand expatriates in the United States
New Zealand Labour Party MPs
20th-century New Zealand lawyers
New Zealand Labour Party leaders
New Zealand legal scholars
New Zealand MPs for Christchurch electorates
New Zealand republicans
People educated at Nelson College
People from Nelson, New Zealand
Prime Ministers of New Zealand
University of Chicago Law School alumni
University of Iowa faculty
Victoria University of Wellington alumni
Academic staff of the Victoria University of Wellington
Members of the New Zealand House of Representatives
New Zealand Knights Commander of the Order of St Michael and St George
Honorary Companions of the Order of Australia
New Zealand King's Counsel
New Zealand environmentalists
New Zealand politicians awarded knighthoods
Justice ministers of New Zealand